Filip Mastiš (born 17 July 2002) is a professional Slovak footballer who last played for Fortuna Liga club FK Pohronie as a striker.

Club career

FK Pohronie
Škrteľ made his Fortuna Liga debut for Pohronie in an away fixture against Senica on 11 September 2021. He came on to replace Peter Mazan after 80 minutes of play, with the final score already set at 1–0 for the home side, courtesy of Elvis Mashike Sukisa. He was released from Pohronie during the winter break.

Personal life
Škrteľ studied at a sports gymnasium in Žilina. Škrteľ is related to a former Slovak international defender and captain Martin Škrteľ, who is the cousin of Filip's father Roman.

References

External links
 
 Futbalnet profile 
 Fortuna Liga profile 

2002 births
Living people
People from Ružomberok District
Sportspeople from the Žilina Region
Slovak footballers
Association football forwards
MFK Tatran Liptovský Mikuláš players
FK Pohronie players
2. Liga (Slovakia) players
Slovak Super Liga players